Dear Octopus is a comedy by the playwright and novelist Dodie Smith. It opened at the Queen's Theatre, London on 14 September 1938. On the outbreak of the Second World War in September 1939 the run was halted after 373 performances; after a spell in the provinces in early 1940 the play was brought back to London and played two further runs there until 31 August 1940.

The play depicts the relationships between three generations of a large family. The "dear octopus" of the title refers to the family itself, whose tentacles its members can never escape.

Background
Smith had been a successful playwright throughout the 1930s. Her 1935 play Call It a Day had the longest run of any play by a woman dramatist up to that time, 509 performances. The impresario Binkie Beaumont of H. M. Tennent secured the performing rights of Dear Octopus and offered his friend John Gielgud the romantic lead. Gielgud was happy to accept, having recently finished a season under his own management which had not been particularly profitable. Gielgud's co-star was Marie Tempest. The role of the retiring young employee who is in love with the hero was originally planned for Celia Johnson or Diana Wynyard, but was played by Angela Baddeley to great critical approval.

The play opened in London after a provincial tour.the real first night, at the Queen's Theatre on 14 September 1938, began gloomily.  The crisis in Czechoslovakia was on everyone's mind.  During the first half, the house was subdued, faces grave and laughs few.  It seemed to have become dull.  Then, in the first interval, a dramatic deus ex machina, Charles Morgan, arrived from The Times with news, which spread like wildfire through the theatre, that Neville Chamberlain was flying to meet Hitler at Berchtesgaden.  "It was as if the whole audience breathed a sigh of relief.  And from then on the play went superbly, and built to a magnificent reception."

Original cast
Charles Randolph – Leon Quartermaine 
Dora Randolph – Marie Tempest
Hilda Randolph – Nan Munro
Margery Harvey – Madge Compton
Cynthia Randolph – Valerie Taylor
Nicholas Randolph – John Gielgud (later replaced by Hugh Williams)
Hugh Randolph – John Justin
Gwen (Flouncy) Harvey – Sylvia Hammond
William Harvey – Pat Sylvester
Kathleen (Scrap) Kenton – Muriel Pavlow
Edna Randolph – Una Venning
Kenneth Harvey – Felix Irwin
Laurel Randolph – Jean Ormonde
Belle Schlessinger – Kate Cutler
Grace Fenning (Fenny) – Angela Baddeley
Nanny – Annie Esmond
Gertrude – Margaret Murray
Source: The Times

Plot
As the critics pointed out, there is little plot in the play. The Times summarised the piece thus:

Critical reception
In The Observer, Ivor Brown agreed with his anonymous Times colleague about the lack of plot. He commented that the romance of Fenny and Nicholas provided the play "with what plot it possesses; for the most part it is a family parade offering familiar pleasures. There seems to be a little of everything that playgoers like, from Cinderella in her corner to fun in the nursery, from little talks on God to sentimental speeches on Granny's Golden Wedding." The reviewer in The Manchester Guardian noted that at a poignant scene between the matriarch, the prodigal daughter and an innocent grandchild "handkerchiefs are discreetly a-flutter among the audience in numbers that must delight any dramatist."

Revivals and adaptations
The play was revived in the West End in 1967 at the Haymarket Theatre with Cicely Courtneidge and Jack Hulbert heading a cast that included Lally Bowers, Ursula Howells, Richard Todd and Joyce Carey.

In 1943 the play was turned into a film of the same title directed by Harold French and starring Margaret Lockwood and Michael Wilding.

Notes

References
 
 

1938 plays
British plays adapted into films
Plays by Dodie Smith
West End plays